Nathan Crook Twining (17 January 1869 – 4 July 1924) was a rear admiral of the United States Navy.

Biography
Twining was born in Boscobel, Wisconsin, on 17 January 1869, the son of Nathan Crook Twining Sr. (1834–1924) and his second wife, Mary Jane Rennie. He was raised, in part, by his father's third wife, Margaret E. "Maggie" Rockwell (1849–1919) of Batavia, Kane County, Illinois.

He was appointed a naval cadet in 1885 and graduated from the United States Naval Academy on 7 June 1889.

As the capability of aircraft to bombard warships was grower ever more likely, in 1911 Twining developed the U.S. Navy's first anti-aircraft cannon. The prototype was a 1-pounder. It was not placed in production, but provided the conceptual basis for the upscale 3 inch anti-aircraft cannon mounted on most U.S. warships during World War I.

In 1911 he succeeded his father as an hereditary member of the Delaware Society of the Cincinnati.

He commanded  during the bombardment of Veracruz, Mexico in 1914.

During World War I, he served as Chief of Staff for Admiral William Sims, Commander of Naval Forces in European waters. He was also a member of the Allied War Council.

Rear Admiral Twining retired early in 1923 due to ill health. He died on July 4, 1924, in Nantucket, Massachusetts.

Family
Twining was the uncle of United States Air Force General Nathan F. Twining, and United States Marine Corps General Merrill B. Twining.
Rear Adm. Twining was married to Caroline Twining. Caroline died on October 14, 1943, and is buried next to her husband at Arlington National Cemetery.

Honors
In 1943, the destroyer  was named in his honor.

Awards
 Navy Distinguished Service Medal
 Specially Meritorious Service Medal
 Sampson Medal
 Spanish Campaign Medal
 Mexican Service Medal
 Victory Medal

References 

1869 births
1924 deaths
United States Navy admirals
United States Naval Academy alumni
People from Boscobel, Wisconsin
Military personnel from Wisconsin
American military personnel of the Spanish–American War
United States Navy personnel of World War I
Burials at Arlington National Cemetery